The Voice of Poland (season 7) began airing 3 September 2016 on TVP 2. It aired on Saturdays at 20:05 and 21:10.

Tomson & Baron, Andrzej Piaseczny and Maria Sadowska returned as coaches, while Natalia Kukulska replaced Edyta Górniak. Tomasz Kammel and Maciej Musiał to the role of leading she joined Barbara Kurdej-Szatan replacing singer Halina Mlynkova.

Coaches

Tomson & Baron, Maria Sadowska and Andrzej Piaseczny return as coaches for the 7th edition. Natalia Kukulska replace the role of jurors Edyta Górniak, who resigned from the post of judges in a professional capacity. Moderators Tomasz Kammel, Maciej Musiał, Halina Mlynkova, Remigiusz Jakub Wierzgoń a.k.a. "ReZigiusz" joins the "V-reporter" Marta Siurnik.

Teams
Color key

Blind auditions

Color keys

Episode 1 (September 3, 2016)

Episode 2 (September 3, 2016)

Episode 3 (September 10, 2016)

Episode 4 (September 10, 2016)

Episode 5 (September 17, 2016)

Episode 6 (September 17, 2016)

Episode 7 (September 24, 2016)

Episode 8 (September 24, 2016)

Episode 9 (October 1, 2016)

Episode 10 (October 1, 2016)

The Battle Rounds
After the blind auditions is the battle rounds where two or three artists from each team will battle for a spot in the knockouts. New to this season, however, is the introduction of the Steal Room. This was adapted in the seventh season of The Voice of Holland.

While steals have returned, each artist that is stolen this season will sit in a designated seat in the Steal Room as they watch the other performances. If a coach has stolen one artist but later decides to steal another, the first artist will be replaced and eliminated by the newly-stolen artist. However, different from the Dutch version, each coach could steal up to three times. The battles therefore end with seven participants advancing to the next stage from each team, with six artists won in the battles and one stolen artist from other coaches' teams.

Color keys

The Knockout Round

Episode 14 (October 29, 2016)
Knockouts took place on 29 October 2016.

Color keys

Live Shows

Color keys

Episode 15 (November 5, 2016)

Episode 16 - Quarter-Final (November 12, 2016)

Episode 17 - Semi-Final (November 19, 2016)

Episode 18 - Final (November 26, 2016)

Result details

Results summary of live shows
Color keys
Artist's info

Result details

Team
Artist's info

Result details

References

The Voice of Poland
2016 Polish television seasons